Diana Brown & Barrie K. Sharpe were the act behind the early 1990s music style of groundbeat, an acid jazz/rare groove offshoot that had its roots in the London area and old soul vinyl record shops.

The duo first came to attention in the late 1980s, signing to London Records dance offshoot label, FFRR. They released singles such as "The Masterplan", "Love or Nothing" and "The Sun Worshippers (Positive Thinking)", as well as the album, The Black, the White, the Yellow and the Brown.

UK singles discography

References

External links
 black-music-collectors
  In Da Mix - Sharpe & Brown

English electronic music duos
Male–female musical duos
FFRR Records artists